Jang Young-ran (born September 19, 1979) is a South Korean actress and trot singer. Debuted in 2003, she is one of the VJs in Mnet Korea. She also participates in variety of Korean talk shows. In May 2009, she released her debut single "The Mask" under the name "Rani". The change of her career direction was to give the audiences a new concept of her real self and hopes to relieve herself from her unpopular image she had built up from TV show appearances.

Personal life 
Jang married her husband, an oriental doctor, in 2009 and has two children.

In June 2022, Jang announced her third child. Later on July, Jang made the announcement via Instagram that she had a third miscarriage.

Career

Album
2009 The Mask (라니)

Drama
2008: Our Home (SBS)
2007: Insooni is Pretty (KBS)
2007: Hello! Baby (KBS)
2005: Marry a Millionaire (SBS)

Film
2007: Donggabnaegi Extracurricular Lesson 2

Television appearances
2015:  Srange Bedfellows
2008: The Great Wall:Love of the Night'
2008: Star Golden Bell2005:  Real time Saturday|Love Letter2003: TV entertainment Night
2003:  PHONE 2 FUN
Ongamenet Game Journalist
 2021 : Woman Plus - Host 
 2021 : Money Touch Me - Host 
 2021 : Pleasant Counseling Center - Host
 2022: The Grievous Couple - Host
 2022: Will the breakup be a recall? - Host with Yang Se-hyung
 2022 : Omniscient Interfering View - Assembly
 2022: Attack on Sisters''; Host with Park Mi-sun

Musicals
2006: Scissors Family

Radio
2008: Jang Youngran's Sensitivity Club

References

External links
 Naver Youngran's infopage (Korean)

1979 births
South Korean television personalities
VJs (media personalities)
Living people
South Korean television actresses
South Korean film actresses